Sterling Damarco Brown (born February 10, 1995) is an American professional basketball player for the Raptors 905 of the NBA G League. He played college basketball for Southern Methodist University (SMU) from 2013 to 2017. As a senior, he earned second-team all-conference honors in the American Athletic Conference (AAC). Brown was drafted 46th overall in the 2017 NBA draft by the Philadelphia 76ers.

High school and college career

Brown is the son of Chris Brown who was a police officer in the Chicago metropolitan area for 30 years in Maywood, Illinois. Brown played high school basketball at Proviso East High School in Maywood, Illinois. Playing for coach Donnie Boyce, he led the Pirates to a state runner-up finish in 2012 and a state semi-final appearance in 2013, losing both times to the Jabari Parker-led Simeon Career Academy. Brown ultimately selected SMU and coach Larry Brown over Miami, Tennessee and Xavier.

Brown and the Mustang class of 2017 endured three years of adversity as they missed the NCAA tournament in his freshman season. The following season, they were upset in the first round of the Tournament. In his junior year, SMU served an NCAA probation in 2015–16. In his senior season, Brown averaged 13.4 points and 6.5 rebounds per game. Along with Semi Ojeleye he led the Mustangs to a 30–5 record and regular-season and Tournament American Athletic Conference championships. At the close of the season, Brown was named second-team All-conference. Brown finished his Mustang career as the school's all-time leader in wins.

Professional career

Milwaukee Bucks (2017–2020)
Following the close of his college career, Brown raised his profile by appearing in the NABC College All-Star game and attended the Portsmouth Invitational Tournament. He was considered a potential second-round prospect for the 2017 NBA draft. Brown was drafted in the second round with the 46th pick of the 2017 NBA draft by the Philadelphia 76ers. On July 6, 2017, his draft rights were traded to the Milwaukee Bucks in exchange for cash considerations. Brown appeared in his first NBA game on October 20, 2017, against the Cleveland Cavaliers, posting three points in six minutes in Milwaukee's second game of the season. On November 3, 2018, Brown was assigned to the Wisconsin Herd. In his first game of the 2018–19 season, he scored 22 points on 10-of-17 from the field. When Malcolm Brogdon was unavailable on January 20, 2018, against Philadelphia, Brown started and scored 14 points. He posted a season-high 15 points on March 7, against the Houston Rockets.

On January 26, 2018, Brown was tased and arrested inappropriately according to the Milwaukee Police Department Police Chief Alfonso Morales the following May. Brown brought suit in June 2018 after the May release of bodycam footage and alleges racial profiling occurred in the administration of a parking ticket at a Walgreens parking lot. After the incident an investigation was launched which resulted in 8 officers disciplined, with 3 of them suspended and 1 officer terminated.

In October 2019, Brown rejected a $400,000 settlement offer from the Milwaukee City Council. The high settlement offer was a legal maneuver intended to take advantage of Federal Rules of Civil Procedure 68. Under Rule 68 Sterling is responsible for the city's legal fees and incurred expenses if he loses the case or wins damages less than $400,000. Brown expressed that he rejected the offer in part due to his ability and sense of responsibility to use his platform as an NBA player to raise awareness. Brown's attorney, Mark Thomsen, condemned the settlement offer, saying it was the city's attempt to save face instead of admitting wrong doing. As of November 27, 2019, court filings indicate that a federal civil rights lawsuit is proceeding to trial.

On March 31, 2019, Brown posted a career-high 27 points, including a go-ahead layup with 1.1 seconds remaining in overtime against the Atlanta Hawks.

Houston Rockets (2020–2021)
On November 26, 2020, Brown signed with the Houston Rockets.

On April 18, 2021, Brown suffered serious facial injuries during a fight outside of a Miami night club.

Dallas Mavericks (2021–2022)
Brown signed with the Dallas Mavericks on August 10, 2021. He made his debut on October 21, 2021, in a 87–113 loss to the Atlanta Hawks, scoring three points.

On June 24, 2022, Brown was traded alongside Boban Marjanović, Trey Burke, Marquese Chriss, and the draft rights to Wendell Moore Jr., to the Houston Rockets in exchange for Christian Wood.

On September 30, 2022, Brown was traded, along with David Nwaba, Trey Burke, and Marquese Chriss, to the Oklahoma City Thunder in exchange for Derrick Favors, Ty Jerome, Maurice Harkless, Théo Maledon and a future second-round pick. On October 2, Brown was waived by the Thunder.

Raptors 905 (2022–2023)
On December 17, 2022, Brown signed with Raptors 905 of the NBA G League.

Los Angeles Lakers (2023)
On January 6, 2023, Brown signed a 10-day contract with the Los Angeles Lakers. He appeared in four games for the Lakers, and his contract expired on January 16.

Return to the 905 (2023–present)
On January 16, 2023, Brown was re-acquired by the Raptors 905.

Career statistics

NBA

Regular season

|-
| style="text-align:left;"| 
| style="text-align:left;"| Milwaukee
| 54 || 4 || 14.4 || .400 || .352 || .875 || 2.6 || .5 || .6 || .2 || 4.0
|-
| style="text-align:left;"| 
| style="text-align:left;"| Milwaukee
| 58 || 7 || 17.8 || .465 || .361 || .690 || 3.2 || 1.4 || .4 || .1 || 6.4
|-
| style="text-align:left;"| 
| style="text-align:left;"| Milwaukee
| 52 || 1 || 14.8 || .371 || .324 || .800 || 3.5 || 1.0 || .6 || .1 || 5.1
|-
| style="text-align:left;"| 
| style="text-align:left;"| Houston
| 51 || 14 || 24.1 || .448 || .423 || .806 || 4.4 || 1.4 || .8 || .2 || 8.2
|-
| style="text-align:left;"| 
| style="text-align:left;"| Dallas
| 49 || 3 || 12.8 || .381 || .304 || .933 || 3.0 || .7 || .3 || .1 || 3.3
|-
| style="text-align:left;"| 
| style="text-align:left;"| L.A. Lakers
| 4 || 0 || 6.0 || .000 || .000 ||  || 2.0 || .5 || .8 || .0 || .0
|- class="sortbottom"
| style="text-align:center;" colspan="2"| Career
| 268 || 29 || 16.6 || .419 || .363 || .796 || 3.3 || 1.0 || .5 || .2 || 5.3

Playoffs

|-
| style="text-align:left;"| 
| style="text-align:left;"| Milwaukee
| 3 || 0 || 4.3 || .600 || .333 || – || .7 || .0 || .3 || .0 || 2.3
|-
| style="text-align:left;"| 
| style="text-align:left;"| Milwaukee
| 11 || 5 || 14.7 || .395 || .333 || .727 || 2.7 || 1.7 || .5 || .3 || 4.1
|-
| style="text-align:left;"| 
| style="text-align:left;"| Milwaukee
| 1 || 0 || 4.0 || .000 || .000 || – || 1.0 || .0 || .0 || .0 || .0
|-
| style="text-align:left;"| 
| style="text-align:left;"| Dallas
| 9 || 0 || 2.9 || .300 || .000 || .714 || .9 || .3 || .4 || .2 || 1.2
|- class="sortbottom"
| style="text-align:center;" colspan="2"| Career
| 24 || 5 || 8.5 || .389 || .276 || .722 || 1.7 || .9 || .5 || .2 || 2.6

College

|-
| style="text-align:left;"| 2013–14
| style="text-align:left;"| SMU
| 37 || 26 || 19.4 || .469 || .362 || .571 || 3.8 || 1.1 || .7 || .3 || 4.4
|-
| style="text-align:left;"| 2014–15
| style="text-align:left;"| SMU
| 34 || 17 || 23.9 || .525 || .444 || .784 || 4.6 || 2.1 || .9 || .2 || 5.2
|-
| style="text-align:left;"| 2015–16
| style="text-align:left;"| SMU
| 30 || 29 || 27.2 || .602 || .536 || .857 || 4.4 || 2.6 || 1.1 || .4 || 10.1
|-
| style="text-align:left;"| 2016–17
| style="text-align:left;"| SMU
| 35 || 34 || 32.7 || .459 || .449 || .791 || 6.5 || 3.0 || 1.4 || .5 || 13.4
|- class="sortbottom"
| style="text-align:center;" colspan="2"| Career
| 136 || 106 || 25.7 || .504 || .451 || .770 || 4.8 || 2.2 || 1.0 || .4 || 8.2

2018 Milwaukee police incident
On January 26, 2018, at 2 am, Brown was approached by a Milwaukee police officer because his car was straddling two handicapped parking spaces.  This occurred in a nearly empty Walgreens parking lot on the south end of the city, the intersection of South 27th street and National Ave. After Brown interacted with the officer, who requested backup, a number of officers arrived on scene. Several minutes after the first officer began talking with Brown, an officer yelled at Brown to remove his hands from the pockets of his hoodie. Brown responded, "I’ve got stuff in my hands". He was subsequently tackled to the ground and tased. Brown was arrested on suspicion of resisting arrest, but the case was not referred to prosecutors after an internal review.

Four months later, the Milwaukee Police Department released the approximately 30-minute video taken by police body camera. After negative public reaction, the Milwaukee Police Chief Alfonso Morales indicated that the officers had been disciplined for acting "inappropriately". Brown called the incident "an attempt at police intimidation, followed by the unlawful use of physical force."

On May 4 in a 14–0 vote, the City of Milwaukee Common Council approved a $750,000 settlement with Sterling Brown over the 2018 incident with police. Although the settlement contained no admission of constitutional rights violations, it did contain an apology and recognition of an unnecessary escalation despite Brown's calm behavior. Officers involved in the action have been suspended, reassigned, and others required to undergo retraining. Moreover, the settlement called for a change in police tactics and institutes a set of anti-racist policing policies and procedures that discipline officers for violating civil and human rights. The settlement also includes a new requirement that officers log every event in which an officer draws a gun.

Personal life
Sterling Brown is the younger brother of two-time NBA champion Shannon Brown.

References

External links

SMU Mustangs bio

1995 births
Living people
21st-century African-American sportspeople
African-American basketball players
American expatriate basketball people in Canada
American men's basketball players
Basketball players from Illinois
Dallas Mavericks players
Houston Rockets players
Los Angeles Lakers players
Milwaukee Bucks players
Philadelphia 76ers draft picks
Raptors 905 players
Shooting guards
SMU Mustangs men's basketball players
Sportspeople from Maywood, Illinois
Wisconsin Herd players